Mélido Turpen Gross Pérez (born February 15, 1966), is a former right-handed Major League Baseball pitcher who played from  through  for the Kansas City Royals, Chicago White Sox, and New York Yankees.

Career

Kansas City Royals
The Kansas City Royals signed Melido as an undrafted free agent in 1983. He made his major league debut for the Kansas City Royals on September 4, 1987. In that game, Pérez pitched seven innings of shutout ball for the victory. On December 10, 1987, Melido was traded with Chuck Mount (minors), John Davis and Greg Hibbard to the Chicago White Sox for Floyd Bannister and Dave Cochrane.

Chicago White Sox
In 4 seasons with the White Sox, Melido appeared in 147 games, starting 106, and pitching 713 innings while compiling a 44–45 record; all the highest cumulative totals he accrued with one team during his career.

In his first season at Chicago, Perez started 32 games, posting a 12–10 record with a 3.79 ERA.  He finished 6th in the American League Rookie of the Year Award voting.

Perez was the White Sox's Opening Day starter in 1990.  Later that season, he threw a no-hitter against the New York Yankees in a game shortened to 7 innings by rain. The following year, Major League Baseball revised its definition of a no-hitter, stating that a pitcher must complete at least 9 innings to achieve the feat, retroactively disallowing Perez's and 35 other shortened no-hitters, as well as the Yankees' Andy Hawkins' no-hitter against the White Sox earlier that year.

On January 10, 1992, Melido was traded by the Chicago White Sox with Domingo Jean and Bob Wickman to the New York Yankees for Steve Sax.

New York Yankees
In 1992, Melido had his best year statistically, striking out 218 batters - second in the American League behind Randy Johnson - and was third in the AL with 7.922 strikeout average per 9 innings while maintaining a 2.87 ERA. His career with the Yankees ended at the end of the 1995 season after a tear in his right throwing elbow.

Cleveland Indians
In 1997, Melido was invited to the Cleveland Indians spring training. He did not make the cut for the season roster.

Post career
Melido currently lives in Santo Domingo, Dominican Republic with his wife and three children. He earned an estimated $16 million in his nine-year career.

He is also known for giving up Manny Ramírez's first career home run.

Currently, Perez is the mayor of San Gregorio de Nigua in the Dominican Republic.

See also
 Carlos Pérez (younger brother)
 Pascual Pérez (older brother)
 Yorkis Pérez (cousin)

References

External links
 Career statistics and player information from Baseball Reference, or Baseball-Reference (Minors)

1966 births
Living people
Azucareros del Este players
Burlington Expos players
Caimanes del Sur players
Charleston Royals players
Chicago White Sox players
Dominican Republic expatriate baseball players in the United States
Eugene Emeralds players
Gulf Coast Yankees players
Fort Myers Royals players
Kansas City Royals players

Major League Baseball pitchers
Major League Baseball players from the Dominican Republic
Memphis Chicks players
New York Yankees players
Norwich Navigators players
People from San Cristóbal, Dominican Republic
Tigres del Licey players